Puntius brevis, sometimes known as the swamp barb (although Puntius chola is also known by that name), is a species of ray-finned fish in the genus Puntius. It is found in the Mekong and Chao Phraya basins. Puntius spilopterus is sometimes considered conspecific.

This fish is one of the identified hosts of Opisthorchis viverrini, the Southeast Asian liver fluke.

References 

Puntius
Taxa named by Pieter Bleeker
Fish described in 1850
Barbs (fish)